The Bessemer City Downtown Historic District is a national historic district in Bessemer City, Gaston County, North Carolina. It encompasses 23 contributing buildings and 10 contributing structures in Bessemer City's central business district. The buildings were built between after 1896, and include one- and two-story commercial buildings and two large, sprawling textile mill complexes. Notable buildings include:

 Whetstone Cotton Mills-Huss Manufacturing Company-Algodon Manufacturing Division of Pyramid Mills (1903, 1909, c. 1960)
 Southern Cotton Mills-Osage Manufacturing Company (1895, 1896, c. 1905, c. 1935, c. 1960)
 Gamble Hardware (c. 1945)
 Central Drug Store (1927, 1960s)
 Winn-Dixie Grocery (c. 1926)
 Shulman's Department Store (c. 1920; c. 1940; c. 1960)
 Kincaid Service Station and Pontiac Dealership (1932, c. 1937, c. 1960).

It was listed on the National Register of Historic Places in 2014.

Gallery

References

Historic districts on the National Register of Historic Places in North Carolina
Buildings and structures in Gaston County, North Carolina
National Register of Historic Places in Gaston County, North Carolina